is a temple of the Myoshin-ji branch of Japanese Rinzai School of Zen Buddhism in Shimizu-ku, Shizuoka, Japan.

History
According to the oral tradition, Shōgen-ji was initially built as a Tendai temple during Saicho's visit to Eastern Japan in 817. Later, in the Kamakura period the temple was transferred to the Rinzai School and renamed to its present characters borrowing the characters of the Jōgen (also read as Shōgen) imperial era (承元, 1207–11). 

Historically verifiable records indicate that during the Muromachi period the temple was selected as one of regional "peace-protection temples"  by the Muromachi bakufu. It was burned to the ground during Takeda Shingen's invasion of Suruga.
 
The present abbot of the temple is Zen master, Soiku Shigematsu

Location
Take a bus headed to Tadanuma Shako 但沼車庫 from Okitsu Station (approx. 10 min) or Shimizu Station (approx. 30 min), exit at Shōgenji Mae 承元寺前, walk down across the river for 10 min. Otherwise take a taxi from Okitsu Station.

Address: 299 Shōgenji-cho, Shimizu-ku, Shizuoka, Japan 424-0201.

References

External links 
  Coordinates and contact details in Japanese.

Myoshin-ji temples
Rinzai temples